The Communauté de communes du canton de Roisel  is a former communauté de communes in the Somme département and in the Picardie région of France. It was created in December 1994. It was merged into the Communauté de communes de la Haute Somme in 2013.

Composition 
This Communauté de communes comprised 22 communes:

Aizecourt-le-Bas
Bernes
Driencourt
Épehy
Fins
Guyencourt-Saulcourt
Hancourt
Hervilly
Hesbécourt
Heudicourt
Liéramont
Longavesnes
Marquaix
Pœuilly
Roisel
Ronssoy
Sorel
Templeux-la-Fosse
Templeux-le-Guérard
Tincourt-Boucly
Villers-Faucon
Vraignes-en-Vermandois

See also 
Communes of the Somme department

References 

Roisel